Calcimitra subflava is a species of sea snail, a marine gastropod mollusk in the family Mitridae, the miters or miter snails.

Description
The shell size varies between 25 mm and  65 mm

Distribution
This species is distributed in the Pacific Ocean along Japan and the Philippines.

References

 Cernohorsky W. O. (1976). The Mitrinae of the World. Indo-Pacific Mollusca 3(17) page(s): 352

External links
 Gastropods.com : Mitra (Mitra) subflava;, accessed : 10 December 2010

Mitridae
Gastropods described in 1971